The  Maritime University of Szczecin (Akademia Morska until 2022) is a public university in Szczecin, Poland. The profile of the university is maritime education. 
The University structure:
 Faculty of Navigation
 Faculty of Maritime Engineering
 Faculty of Economics and Transport Engineering
Faculty of Mechatronics and Electrical Engineering
Faculty of Computer Science and Telecommunications
The structure of the University also includes:

 Centre for Maritime Technology Transfer
 International Students & Mobility Office.

The Maritime University of Szczecin and AGH University of Science and Technology have established educational cooperation in scope of maritime mining.

Training programs 

Sea-going programmes:
 navigation (in Polish and English language)
 mechanical engineering
 mechatronics 
Other programmes
 transport
 naval architecture
 geodesy and cartography
 computer science
 logistics
 management and engineering of production

References

External links 
 
 International Students & Mobility Office

Universities and colleges in Poland
Educational institutions established in 1947
Universities and colleges in Szczecin
1947 establishments in Poland
Maritime colleges in Europe